Amanda Perrett is an English horse-racing trainer who runs Coombelands Racing Stables in Pulborough, West Sussex, England. Since she took over Coombelands in 1996 from her father, former champion trainer Guy Harwood, Amanda has trained over six hundred and fifty winners and generated over eight million in prize money. She is married to former jockey Mark Perrett.

Major wins
 France
 Prix de la Forêt - (1) - Indian Lodge (2000)
 Prix du Moulin de Longchamp - (1) - Indian Lodge (2000)

References

 Amanda Perrett website

British racehorse trainers
Living people
Year of birth missing (living people)
People from Pulborough